Sadashiv Kanoji Patil (abbreviated as S. K. Patil) (1898–1981) was a former Congress leader from Maharashtra. A veteran freedom-fighter, he was a qualified journalist, scholar and orator. He was thrice elected mayor of Bombay and was known as "the uncrowned king of Bombay". He supported, assisted and nurtured a number of institutions, particularly in Mumbai and enriched the city culturally.

Early life 
He was born in 1898 in the village of Zarap between Kudal and Sawantwadi. His father was a police officer in Kolhapur State. He studied law in Poona, then migrated to Bombay at the age of 23 in 1921 to join the chambers of barrister Velingkar. He started his own law practice in 1929 and practised primarily in the small causes court and the city civil court, and a few civil appeal cases on the appellate side of the Bombay High Court. He was briefed to appear with M.A. Jinnah in a few criminal cases in the early 1930s. By the end of his active practice in the mid 1940s, he came to be known as a forceful pleader in first appeals before the high court. He was frequently briefed to appear before various district courts in Bombay Province.

Career 
He was the Member of Parliament from Bombay when it was part of the unified Bombay State. He was a union minister during the time of Jawaharlal Nehru, Lal Bahadur Shashtri and Indira Gandhi.  From 1964 to 1967 he was the union minister for railways. Though a three-time MP, he was defeated by George Fernandes in Mumbai South (Lok Sabha constituency) in 1967 for 4th Lok Sabha. He then fought a by-poll from Banaskantha in Gujarat and rejoined Lok Sabha. In 1969, during  the split in the Congress party, he along with Morarji Desai and Nijalingappa became the leading lights of the Congress (O) faction. He contested from Banaskantha Lok Sabha seat in 1971 on Congress (O) ticket but lost to the Congress (R) candidate.

In the Lok Sabha discussions on the report of the States Reorganisation Commission, on 15 November 1955, Patil demanded that the Bombay city be constituted as an autonomous city-state, laying great stress on its cosmopolitan character. However, Bombay state was partitioned into the present day states of Gujarat and Maharashtra in 1960, and the city of Bombay (now called Mumbai) became the capital of Maharashtra.

References

External links

S.K. Patil materials in the South Asian American Digital Archive (SAADA)

Marathi politicians
Lok Sabha members from Maharashtra
Members of the Constituent Assembly of India
India MPs 1952–1957
India MPs 1957–1962
India MPs 1962–1967
Indian independence activists from Maharashtra
Mayors of Mumbai
Indian political journalists
1898 births
1981 deaths
Members of the Cabinet of India
Railway Ministers of India
Indian National Congress (Organisation) politicians
20th-century Indian journalists
India MPs 1967–1970
Lok Sabha members from Gujarat
Journalists from Maharashtra

Politicians from Mumbai
Ministers of Power of India